Good Morning, Miami is an American sitcom created by David Kohan and Max Mutchnick. The series ran on NBC from September 26, 2002, to December 18, 2003, and centered around the personal and professional life of Jake (Mark Feuerstein), the executive producer of an incredibly low-rated morning show in Miami, Florida. The series was one of the first on NBC to be fully originated in high definition.

The series was launched as a part of the network's highly-rated "Must See TV" lineup, where it struggled in the ratings when compared to other sitcoms in the lineup, such as Kohan and Mutchnick's own Will & Grace. Midway through the second season, NBC pulled the series after Kohan and Mutchnick sued the network. The series never returned, and the final nine episodes were ultimately left unaired. These episodes were later shown on TG4 in Ireland and Channel 4 in the United Kingdom.

Synopsis
Wunderkind producer Jake Silver decides to accept the job leading the lowest-rated morning show in Miami. He falls in love with the show's beautiful, down-to-earth hairdresser, Dylan. The carnival of clowns at the station includes pompous and insulting on-air host Gavin; Jake's sardonic assistant, Penny; and highly insecure station manager, Frank.

Early in the first season, Gavin's morning co-host was Lucia, and Sister Brenda was the station's nun/weather-girl. Eventually, Jake's foul-mouthed grandmother, Claire, becomes the on-screen co-host. Both Lucia and Sister Brenda were written out early in the series as the producers were still searching for the "center" of their program.

During the second season, Jake and Dylan begin a relationship, almost even deciding on relocation to New York together. Victoria Hill, a new station boss, took over the show to get higher ratings, and Gavin struggled to warm up to her. A new weather girl, Joni, was also introduced--much to Gavin's dismay.

The series ended with Gavin and Penny deciding to start a relationship (as Penny is pregnant with his baby), Frank marrying Gavin's mother as a publicity stunt, and Jake and Dylan agreeing to go their separate ways (Jake leaves the station and goes to produce at NBC in Manhattan, while Dylan returns to her home state of Omaha, Nebraska).

Cast and characters

Main
 Mark Feuerstein - Jake Silver
 Ashley Williams as Dylan Messinger
 Matt Letscher - Gavin Stone
 Constance Zimmer - Penelope "Penny" Barnes Barrington
 Jere Burns as Frank Jennifer Alfano
 Tessie Santiago as Lucia Rojas-Klein, Gavin's morning co-host (episodes 1-11)
 Brooke Dillman as Sister Brenda Trogman, a nun who is also the station's weather girl (episodes 1-11)
 Suzanne Pleshette as Claire Arnold, Jake's grandmother (season 1)

Recurring
 Stephon Fuller as Robby
 Tiffani Thiessen as Victoria Hill, a new station boss in season two
 Jillian Barberie as Joni, the station's new weather girl in season two
 Bob Clendenin as Carl, a station camera man
 Tracy Vilar as Stacey
 Edward James Gage as Tiny, the station helicopter pilot

Production
The sitcom was filmed at CBS Studio Center's Stage 16 The theme song, entitled "Once in a Lifetime", is played by John Rzeznik of the Goo Goo Dolls. In the second season, exterior footage of NBC affiliate WPTV-TV's studio complex in West Palm Beach, Florida, was used to portray the exteriors of the fictional Good Morning, Miami studios.

In the original, unaired test Pilot the part of Gavin was played by actor Burke Moses. The part of Penny was played by an uncredited actress and the character was completely different.

Episodes
During the original run of the series, the first episodes were broadcast out of intended production order by NBC as the series struggled in the ratings. First, completely discarding the episode titled, "It Didn't Happen One Night," then failing to run the Christmas themed episode until the second week of January, after first running another new episode during the first week of January.

Despite renewing the series, only half of the second season was ever broadcast in the United States by NBC. The entire series was aired on TG4 in Ireland several times in a daily morning time slot. Channel 4 UK also broadcast the entire series.

Season 1 (2002–03)

Season 2 (2003–04)

References

External links
 

2000s American sitcoms
2000s American workplace comedy television series
2002 American television series debuts
2003 American television series endings
English-language television shows
NBC original programming
Television series about television
Television shows set in Miami
Television series by Warner Bros. Television Studios